Christodoulos Tsigantes (30 January 1897 – October 11, 1970) was a Greek general who distinguished himself as the commander of the Sacred Band during the Second World War. He was born in Tulcea, Romania to Greek parents of Kefalonian origin and died in London, where he was cremated.

Following the failure of the 1935 Greek coup d'état attempt Lieutenant Colonel Christodoulos Tsigantes, his brother Captain Ioannis Tsigantes, Colonel Stefanos Sarafis and other participants of the coup were cashiered in a public ceremony.

References

1897 births
1970 deaths
Greek generals
Greek military leaders of World War II
Place of birth missing
Romanian emigrants to Greece
People from Tulcea
People from Cephalonia